Speculative art can refer to:
Gambling
Investment
Investing in fine art
Fantasy art
Science fiction art
Alchemy

See also

Futurology
Futurism
Surrealism
Absurdism
Dada
Speculative poetry
Speculative fiction